Luther is an American syndicated newspaper comic strip published from 1968 to 1986, created and produced by cartoonist Brumsic Brandon Jr. The series, about an African-American elementary-school child, was the second mainstream comic strip to star an African-American in the lead role, following Dateline: Danger! (1968-1974), the first to do so. Another predecessor, Wee Pals (1965-2014), featured an African-American among an ensemble cast of different races and ethnicities.

Publication history

Brumsic Brandon Jr., who published his first cartoon in 1945, did editorial cartoons before conceiving of a comic strip about inner-city African-American children and a gently satirical theme about the struggle for racial equality. He named his title character, a third-grader, after Civil Rights activist the Rev. Dr. Martin Luther King Jr.

In 1968, the Long Island newspaper Newsday began syndicating Luther through its own small syndicate, Newsday Specials, in conjunction with Reporters' News Syndicate, an initiative designed to increase minority participation in journalism, In 1970, following the purchase of Newsday by the Times Mirror, the strip became syndicated widely through the corporation's the Los Angeles Times Syndicate.

Brumsic's daughter, Barbara Brandon, who would grow up to become the first nationally syndicated female African-American cartoonist, sometimes assisted her father with such tasks as applying Letratone, a transparent sheet with dots that read in print as African-American skin tone.

Cast
Source:
Luther, a third grader
Hardcore, his classmate, who wears a baseball cap
Pee Wee, their friend, a kindergartener
Mary Frances and Oreo, two African-American girls
Lily, a blond Caucasian girl
Miss Backlash, the third-grade teacher

The children attended the Alabaster Avenue Elementary School.

Critical analysis
Cartoon historian Maurice Horn wrote that, "Although his gags were often about racism, Brandon was also successful in using his nicely designed urban inner-city kids to get his message of racial equality across."

The African-American artist and essayist Oliver W. Harrington wrote in 1976 that with Luther,

Luther collections
Luther from Inner City (Independent Publishers Group, 1969;)
Luther Tells It as It Is! (Paul S. Eriksson, 1970;)
Right on, Luther!  (Paul S, Eriksson, 1971;)
Luther Raps (Paul S, Eriksson, 1971;)
Outta Sight Luther (Paul S. Eriksson, 1972;)
Luther's Got Class (Paul S. Eriksson, 1976;)

See also
Quincy

References

External links

1968 comics debuts
1986 comics endings
African-Americans in comic strips
American comic strips
Child characters in comics
Comics characters introduced in 1968
Comics set in the United States
Gag-a-day comics
Male characters in comics
Satirical comics